The Odisha women's football team is an Indian women's football team representing the state of Odisha, India. The Football Association of Odisha, a state association of All India Football Federation, manages the team. The team competes as a member of the All India Football Federation, in the Senior Women's National Football Championship, the topmost women's knock-out league of Indian football.

Stadium

Established in 1978, the Kalinga Stadium in Bhubaneswar, serves as the home ground of Odisha. The 15,000-capacity stadium has hosted several national and international tournaments including the I-League, Super Cup, and Women's Gold Cup. It is scheduled to host the 2022 FIFA U-17 Women's World Cup. The stadium is also the home base for the national and youth team camps. Indian Arrows, AIFF's developmental side, is also based at the Kalinga Stadium.

Personnel

Players

Current squad
 The following 20 players were called up for the 2022 National Games.

Results and fixtures

2021

2022

Management

Board of Directors

Honours

State
Senior Women's National Football Championship
 Winners (1): 2010–11
 Runners-up (5): 2001–02, 2007–08, 2009–10, 2013–14, 2018–19
National Games
 Gold medal (2): 2007, 2011
 Silver medal (2): 2015, 2022
 Bronze medal (1): 2002
Junior Girl's National Football Championship
 Runners-up (8): 2002–03, 2005–06, 2007–08, 2008–09, 2011–12, 2013–14, 2015–16, 2017–18
Sub–Junior Girl's National Football Championship
 Winners (1): 2006–07
 Runners-up (7): 2003–04, 2004–05, 2007–08, 2008–09, 2009–10, 2010–11, 2018–19

Others
Pem Dorjee Memorial Cup
 Runners-up: 2009

References

Football in Odisha
Women's football teams in India
Organizations with year of establishment missing